is the titular character in Nintendo's The Legend of Zelda video game series. She was created by Shigeru Miyamoto and introduced in the original 1986 game The Legend of Zelda. She is one of the central characters in the series, having appeared in multiple incarnations over more than three decades. In the fictional storyline of the series, she is a princess of the kingdom of Hyrule, an associate of the protagonist Link, and bearer of the Triforce of Wisdom.

Though she is the eponymous character, Zelda's story role is often that of a damsel in distress or donor who assists Link. In many games, Zelda is captured by the antagonist Ganon, necessitating Link to come to her rescue. In several games she is one of the Sages or Champions whose heroism is essential to defeating Ganon; in others, like Ocarina of Time and The Wind Waker, she adopts alternative personas to take a more active role in the story. In Skyward Sword, she is established as the mortal reincarnation of the goddess Hylia, which gives her incarnations a range of magical powers.

Zelda is a widely recognisable character in video gaming and a popular character with gamers and cosplayers. In addition to The Legend of Zelda series, she has appeared as a playable character in a number of spin-off games and other game series, including Hyrule Warriors, Cadence of Hyrule and Hyrule Warriors: Age of Calamity. She also appears as a playable character in the Super Smash Bros. series. Critics have responded positively to her character development and have listed her as one of the greatest female video game characters of all time.

Concept and creation
According to Shigeru Miyamoto, co-creator of The Legend of Zelda series, Princess Zelda's name was inspired by that of Zelda Fitzgerald, an American novelist, dancer, and socialite, as well as the wife of fellow novelist F. Scott Fitzgerald. In the Nintendo book titled Hyrule Historia, Miyamoto elaborated on the origin of the character's name and the title of the series. He stated that a PR planner had suggested creating an illustrated story for the game involving the rescue of a princess who was defined as an eternal beauty. He said to Miyamoto, 'There's a famous American author whose wife's name is Zelda. How about giving that name to the eternal beauty?' Miyamoto explained: "I couldn't really get behind the book idea but I really liked the name Zelda. I asked him if I could use it, and he said that would be fine. And that's where the title The Legend of Zelda was born".

The original 1986 video game The Legend of Zelda established Princess Zelda's core role in the series. It centres on the hero Link fighting to protect the kingdom of Hyrule from the antagonist Ganon, whilst saving Princess Zelda. This continued to be the basic premise for each subsequent game in the series, although Zelda's role has varied and evolved over time with each game release.

Character incarnations 
As with Link, there are multiple incarnations of Princess Zelda in the series, who vary in age, appearance, and disposition. Although these incarnations have similar appearances and bear the same name, they are not defined as the same person. Nintendo created a fictional timeline that spans thousands of years of fictional history and creates a continuity for all of the games in the series. The instruction booklet for Zelda II: The Adventure of Link establishes that Zelda's name reoccurs because the prince of the kingdom orders that "every female child born into the royal household shall be given the name Zelda". The Nintendo book Hyrule Historia further emphasises that Zelda is a traditional name in the Hyrule royal family. Skyward Sword also creates an origin story for Zelda and Link's incarnations in which they are both cursed by the antagonist Demise to forever appear when evil occurs in Hyrule.

Character design

Zelda's first appearance in the original The Legend of Zelda video game depicts her in a simple 2D form wearing a dress and small tiara. Illustrations created for the original game and displayed in the Nintendo book titled The Legend Of Zelda Art And Artifacts present a more detailed design for the character dressed in a long pink gown decorated with white bows and wearing a necklace and small tiara. Artwork for Zelda II: The Adventure of Link imitated Zelda's original appearance, presenting her wearing a similar long pink gown and red hair. For the development of A Link to the Past (1991), Zelda was originally designed wearing a sci-fi themed outfit to correspond with an early multi-world game concept, but this was eventually scrapped.

The 1998 video game Ocarina of Time introduced a radical development for the character as a result of the improved graphical capabilities of the Nintendo 64. Princess Zelda was rendered in 3D for the first time and her detailed character model was accompanied by a more intricate backstory and involvement in the game. The princess was created in two forms, as a child and an adult. Her royal dress was designed with greater detail and displays a tabard featuring the Sheikah coat of arms and the Hyrule royal family crest. The storyline also involves the appearance of her alter-ego Sheik.

Zelda appeared in cartoon form in the anime-inspired 2002 video game The Wind Waker. The art style was a vast departure from previous entries, both in terms of the cel-shaded graphics and also in the presentation of the character. Zelda appears as Tetra, a pirate captain whose disguise is vastly different to her traditional appearance as princess. Tetra's hair was designed as a swirl to mimic the wind and smoke in the game. This contrasts with her more traditional appearance as princess in the game wearing long hair and royal dress.

In 2006, the release of Twilight Princess presented Zelda in a more realistic artistic style. The sombre tone of the game is also reflected in the dark portrayal of Zelda's character, which involves her being possessed by Ganondorf to become his puppet. Illustrator Yusuke Nakano tried to portray the princess as a pensive character, "as if she's wondering about something". He drew illustrations of Zelda with feelings of "hopelessness and anxiousness", but tried to avoid depicting her and Link "too full of gloom and doom".

For Spirit Tracks (2009), Zelda was given a more active role in the gameplay, adventuring alongside Link in spirit form, which made a sharp contrast to her damsel in distress role in earlier installments. Eiji Aonuma, the series' longtime manager and producer, explained that this decision reflected the desires of fans and developers alike. A survey conducted in the United States signified consumers preferred more independent female characters, including Zelda's alter-egos Sheik (from Ocarina of Time) and Tetra (from The Wind Waker and Phantom Hourglass). Director, Daiki Iwamoto, also expressed an interest in making Zelda "a more integral part of the game" during the development of Spirit Tracks.

In 2011, Zelda appeared in Skyward Sword as a student of the Knight Academy instead of her usual role as princess. The designers wanted her to look like a "typical village girl" and aimed to "establish her as a heroine". They removed the royal ornamentation from her head and designed her wearing sky blue and a red dress. They also created Zelda in her goddess form, in which she was designed, "dressed simply, and in white". Eiji Aonuma stated that his team had been "looking at how we can create a Zelda that's not just a princess that needs to be rescued, but as somebody who has an active role and has her own part in the story".

For the release of Breath of the Wild in 2017, a variety of concept art was considered for Zelda's character design. In a three-part series on the making of the game, Director Hidemaro Fujibayashi commented that Zelda's character was the most difficult to define: "The planners started by thinking about what kind of person Zelda is, and why she's in a position that makes us want to save her... The designers, on the other hand, took a completely opposite approach, or perhaps I should say different approach compared to the planners. For them it was all about first impressions... about how Zelda's design could make you feel something deep inside". The team was so concerned about her design that they repeatedly made refinements to her design until the end of development. Alongside various dress designs, Zelda's image was updated to include outfits that showed her ready for combat, including the final blue blouse and pants that complemented Link's primary outfit.

Portrayal 
Princess Zelda has been voiced by several voice actors, including Bonnie Jean Wilbur in Link: The Faces of Evil and Zelda: The Wand of Gamelon, Brandy Kopp in Super Smash Bros. Ultimate (World of Light only) and Stephanie Martone in Cadence of Hyrule. She is voiced by Canadian-American actress Patricia Summersett in Breath of the Wild. Summersett is the first English-language voice actress of Princess Zelda in the thirty years of the canonical video game series. Zelda has also been voiced by several Japanese actors, including Jun Mizusawa (Ocarina of Time, Twilight Princess, Super Smash Bros. Melee, Super Smash Bros. Brawl, Super Smash Bros. for Nintendo 3DS and Wii U), Hikari Tachibana (Four Swords Adventures, The Wind Waker, The Minish Cap, Hyrule Warriors), Akane Omae (Spirit Tracks), Ayumi Fujimura (A Link Between Worlds and Super Smash Bros. Ultimate), Saori Seto (Hyrule Warriors) and Yū Shimamura (Skyward Sword, Breath of the Wild and Hyrule Warriors: Age of Calamity).

Characteristics 
Zelda is a princess and member of the royal family of Hyrule. She is typically depicted with blonde or brown hair and blue eyes and wears a royal dress, tiara and jewellery. Her appearance bears the characteristic traits of the Hylians, a fictional people that are human in form with elfin features, such as pointy ears. Throughout the series her age has ranged from a child to a teenager and young adult.

In the early games, Zelda primarily takes the role of the damsel in distress for Link to save after she is kidnapped by the series main antagonist, Ganon. However, her role has evolved over the course of the series. She sometimes assists and guides Link during his adventures and aids him in battle. In Ocarina of Time, she appears dressed as a mysterious ninja named Sheik who helps Link on his journey. In The Wind Waker, she plays an active role in the game in the guise of Tetra and also takes part in the final battle to defeat Ganondorf. In Spirit Tracks she travels alongside Link in the form of a spirit and assists him in overcoming various obstacles. In Breath of the Wild, she plays a prominent role in the storyline, with a complete story arc that is revealed in the form of Link's memories and portrays her as an emotionally complex character.

In the lore of the series, the first incarnation of Zelda is the mortal reincarnation of the goddess Hylia, a prominent deity within the games. Each subsequent incarnation of Zelda possesses the blood of the goddess and a range of inherent magical powers. Zelda also represents the physical embodiment of Hylia's struggle to protect the mortal world from evil and takes responsibility for protecting the kingdom of Hyrule.

Zelda is also closely associated with Nayru, one of the three Golden Goddesses who are the creators of the fictional world of Hyrule. Like Link and Ganon, she is the bearer of one third of the Triforce, a mystical artefact and icon within the series. Zelda possesses the Triforce of Wisdom, which gives her the inherent qualities of intelligence and wisdom. In the original 1986 The Legend of Zelda, the Triforce of Wisdom is split into fragments, necessitating Link to retrieve it in order to defeat Ganon. In later games, it manifests itself within Zelda, giving her the ability to conjure light arrows.

Throughout the series, Zelda has wielded various weapons. In Twilight Princess she is depicted holding a sword and also fights with a sword in Hyrule Warriors. She is also skilled in the use of a bow, which she uses to shoot light arrows at enemies, such as Ganondorf. In addition to using the Twilight Bow in Twilight Princess, Zelda's signature weapon is the Bow of Light, a recurring legendary weapon in the series. In Breath of the Wild, it is the most powerful bow in the game and she gifts it to Link to help him defeat Ganon in beast form. In Hyrule Warriors: Age of Calamity, Zelda is able to unleash several powerful attacks using the Bow of Light, including creating rings of light around enemies to deal greater damage. She also uses the Sheikah Slate, a handheld tablet featuring several runes, to attack enemies remotely.

Most iterations of Zelda have magical powers, such as teleportation, precognition, and the ability to heal. In A Link to the Past, she uses telepathy to communicate with Link after being captured. In Breath of the Wild, Zelda locks Ganon away in an alternate dimension using her sealing power, which is unlocked while defending Link during a fatal attack.

Relationships 
Within the lore of the Zelda series, Princess Zelda is directly connected to the other main characters, Link and Ganon. The three characters represent three parts of the Triforce, a mysterious artifact and prominent icon in many Zelda games that creates balance within the fictional universe. While Link embodies courage and Ganon represents power, Zelda's role is to be the embodiment of wisdom. The three characters are repeatedly connected in this struggle for the balance of power.

Zelda's connection to Link has been a central aspect of The Legend of Zelda series, but their relationship has also been varied and ambiguous. Some games, such as Zelda II: The Adventure of Link, Ocarina of Time and Spirit Tracks have hinted at the possibility of a romantic relationship between the two characters. The Legend of Zelda: Skyward Sword placed greater emphasis on a romantic relationship in its storyline. To illustrate this, Nintendo released an official "Romance Trailer" for the game. However, producer Eiji Aonuma had originally planned to cut out any elements of romance from the game but decided to keep it in and explained that "it wasn't that we wanted to create a romance between Link and Zelda as much as we wanted the player to feel like this is a person who's very important to me, who I need to find". In Breath of the Wild a more complex relationship between Link and Zelda is depicted in the storyline, which is revealed within various cutscenes of Link's memories. The memories provide a complete story arc for their relationship in which Zelda initially resents Link, but finally risks everything to protect him.

Alter egos

Sheik

With voice muffled and face concealed, as well as wearing a form-fitting blue unitard with the red Sheikah eye in the center, Sheik is unrecognizable as Zelda. Sheik plays the lyre and teaches Link new songs to help him on his quest. When Link arrives at the Temple of Time near the end of the game, she uses the Triforce of Wisdom and reverts to Zelda. Zelda reveals that she disguised herself as Sheik to hide from Ganondorf, who wants to take the Triforce of Wisdom from her so that he can possess all three pieces of the Triforce and control its power. When she reveals her real identity to Link, she magically transforms into her traditional form wearing her princess attire. This reveal is foreshadowed by a Gossip Stone located outside Hyrule Castle that states, "contrary to her elegant image, Princess Zelda of Hyrule Castle is, in fact, a tomboy". Sheik's gender was the subject of debate, with some fans believing that Zelda transforms herself into a male character in Ocarina of Time. However, Nintendo senior product marketing manager Bill Trinen responded that Sheik is a woman — Zelda in a different outfit. In 2016, Miyamoto revealed in an interview that the development team had considered the possibility of producing a spin-off game with Sheik as the protagonist. Sheik was also released as one of several compatible amiibo with The Legend of Zelda: Breath of the Wild.

Tetra

 is a young pirate captain who is the incarnation of Zelda in The Legend of Zelda: The Wind Waker and its Nintendo DS sequel, The Legend of Zelda: Phantom Hourglass. Like Sheik, she plays a major role in the storyline, by helping Link to find his sister, Aryll. However, rather than purposefully taking on the guise of Tetra, Zelda is unaware of her royal bloodline until the end of the game. Tetra is an orphan who inherits her position as pirate captain from her mother, who died when she was young. Throughout The Wind Waker, she is depicted as a strong but compassionate leader and like Sheik appears at various points in the storyline to help Link. When Ganondorf realises that Tetra is really Zelda, she only believes it is her true identity when it is revealed by the Triforce of Wisdom. Tetra's transformation into Zelda takes place when the long lost king of Hyrule attaches a small golden object to Tetra's necklace to form the Triforce of Wisdom. This surrounds Tetra with blinding white light that subsides and reveals Zelda in her true princess form. After this reveal, she spends the remaining part of the game in her traditional appearance of Zelda, but reappears as Tetra at the end of the game.

The Phantom Hourglass follows on from The Wind Waker with Link and Tetra exploring the sea. Tetra is captured on a ghost ship, and Link must defeat the monster Bellum to save her. In a 2011 interview with GamesRadar+, Eiji Aonuma commented on the possibility of Tetra reappearing within the Zelda series: "Personally, I really like the character, but the director on the DS games after that, Mr. Iwamoto, said he didn't really like her, so he didn't want to use her".

Appearances

The Legend of Zelda series
As the eponymous character of the series, Princess Zelda has appeared in most of The Legend of Zelda games. However, there have been several games in which she does not make an appearance, including Link's Awakening (1993), Majora's Mask (2000), where she only appears in a flashback, and Tri Force Heroes (2015).

In Zelda's first appearance in the original The Legend of Zelda (1986), she is kidnapped by Ganon, the series' main antagonist, who seeks to steal the Triforce of Wisdom from her. Before he is able to capture her, she divides the Triforce of Wisdom into eight pieces and hides the pieces across the land. She is eventually rescued by Link, and the two of them reunite the Triforces of Wisdom and Power. Although Zelda has only a minor role in the game, she was established as a central character in the storyline.

Zelda reappears in the sequel, Zelda II: The Adventure of Link (1987). According to the game's manual, this incarnation of Zelda has been put into an eternal slumber after refusing to give up the power of the Triforce. Link breaks the curse by retrieving the Triforce and using its power to awaken her. This is the first game showing a relationship between the two characters, as Zelda rewards Link with a kiss at the end of the game.

In A Link to the Past (1991), Zelda is given a prominent role in the storyline and is established as a major character in the battle between good and evil. She is described as one of seven maidens descended from seven sages who sealed away Ganon during the Imprisoning War, a battle fought against Ganon's evil army. She is kidnapped and telepathically pleads with Link to rescue her. After being rescued, she and the six other maidens assist Link in breaking the seal on Ganon's tower so that Link may defeat the villain.

In Ocarina of Time (1998), Zelda first appears as a child. Suspicious of the Gerudo King Ganondorf, she charges Link with the task of collecting the three spiritual stones to open the door to the Sacred Realm and obtain the Master Sword and Triforce before Ganondorf does. Just before Link pulls the Master Sword from its pedestal, Ganondorf reveals his wicked intentions and Zelda flees Hyrule Castle with her guardian Impa before he can capture either of them. Still in hiding seven years later, she poses as a young Sheikah boy named Sheik. When Link wakes up after seven years, she guides him on his quest to save Hyrule's Sages before revealing her true identity. With Zelda's help, Link defeats Ganondorf after he transforms into his beast form named Ganon.

In Oracle of Seasons and Oracle of Ages (2001), Zelda only appears after inputting a secret code that is obtained upon completing one of the games. In the storyline, she senses danger in the lands of Holodrum and Labrynna and sends her handmaiden Impa to protect Din, the Oracle of Seasons, and Nayru, the Oracle of Ages. In the full linked game, Zelda is captured by Twinrova and it is revealed that they plan to sacrifice her in order to ignite the Flame of Despair and resurrect Ganon once again, but Link intervenes and takes on Ganon in the final boss battle.

Four Swords (2002) presents Princess Zelda as one of many descendants who protect the seal on the Four Sword. In the plot, she takes Link to the Four Sword Sanctuary, which seals the evil sorcerer Vaati. Sensing that the seal's power is diminishing, she tries to inspect it, but is captured by Vaati, who had already escaped and takes her to his Palace of Winds to marry her. She is again rescued by Link with the power of the Four Sword and together they seal Vaati away.

The Zelda character in The Wind Waker (2002) is unaware of her royal identity, living instead as the pirate captain named Tetra. She first appears in the clutches of a giant bird called the Helmaroc King, though she struggles and is dropped at the top of Link's home island of Outset. She then agrees to help Link rescue his younger sister Aryll, whom the Helmaroc King has subsequently captured. She decides to help Link confront Ganon at the Forbidden Fortress, but they are unsuccessful in defeating him. Ganondorf discovers Tetra's true identity as Princess Zelda when the Triforce of Wisdom is repaired. In the final boss battle against Ganondorf, she assists Link by using his bow to shoot arrows of light.

In Four Swords Adventures (2004), the storyline is set in motion when dark clouds cause Zelda to fear the return of Vaati. While attempting to reseal him, she and the six maidens are captured by Dark Link. To save them, Link uses the Four Sword but accidentally sets Vaati free. After Link rescues her, it is revealed that Ganon is behind the capture. After Vaati is defeated, Zelda helps Link to finally defeat Ganon by giving him the Magic Bow.

In The Minish Cap (2004), Princess Zelda is turned to stone by Vaati, who shatters the legendary Picori Blade and breaks the seal that prevents evil spreading across Hyrule. Link is tasked with saving the princess by restoring the Picori Blade in order to lift the curse.

Twilight Princess (2006) centres around the Twilight King Zant invading the kingdom of Hyrule. Zelda is forced to surrender to Zant in order to protect her people. This results in the kingdom being enveloped in Twilight and the people of Hyrule disappearing and becoming spirits. The game involves Link, who is transformed into a wolf by the Twilight Realm's power, and his companion Midna working together to free Hyrule from the Twilight before finally defeating Zant, who is revealed to be a devotee of Ganondorf. Towards the end of the game, Zelda appears as the ninth boss when she is possessed by Ganondorf and controlled like a puppet. In the final battle with Ganondorf, Zelda accompanies Link on horseback and offers support by stunning Ganondorf with Light Arrows.

Phantom Hourglass (2007) follows on from the storyline of The Wind Waker and reintroduces Zelda in her Tetra incarnation. When Tetra is turned to stone and kidnapped by a Ghost Ship, Link jumps overboard and is rescued by a fairy named Ciela. In order to save Tetra, he must set sail with Ciela and a sea captain named Linebeck to find the guardians of Power, Wisdom, and Courage.

In Spirit Tracks (2009) Zelda meets Link, who is a railroad engineer, at his graduation ceremony. She is attacked by villainous Chancellor Cole and her spirit is separated from her body. In this ghostly form, she agrees to accompany Link on his adventure. Spirit Tracks differs from other Zelda games by featuring Zelda as a playable cooperative character. In her spirit form, she is able to possess Phantom Knights in order to help Link restore the Spirit Tracks. Her character can perform various tasks to help Link, such as carrying him on her shield or distracting enemy Phantoms so that Link can sneak past. 

Though not a princess in Skyward Sword (2011), Zelda is presented as the reincarnation of the goddess Hylia and the character's first incarnation within the fictional timeline. Zelda is a close childhood friend to Link who grew up with him in Skyloft, a place in the clouds. When she is spirited away in a tornado conjured by the demon lord Ghirahim, Link travels to the Surface to search for Zelda. He is eventually reunited with Zelda after opening the Gate of Time. Ghirahim drags Zelda to the past and uses her power to release the antagonist Demise in the past to change events. After Link defeats Demise in battle, he and Zelda remain on the Surface to establish Hyrule Kingdom.

In A Link Between Worlds (2013), Zelda entrusts the Pendant of Courage to Link when the sorcerer Yuga begins capturing the descendants of the Seven Sages. After obtaining the remaining two pendants and drawing the Master Sword, Link pursues Yuga but is made to watch when he turns Zelda into a painting and casts her into the dying world of Lorule. Pursuing them to Lorule, Link is nearly destroyed by Yuga when he uses the Sages to revive Ganon and steal his Triforce of Power, but he is saved when Zelda's Lorule counterpart Princess Hilda binds Yuga. On Hilda's suggestion, Link rescues the Sages and is given the Triforce of Courage, then returns to Hilda only to see her taking Zelda's Triforce of Wisdom. She reveals that everything that had happened in Hyrule was intentionally designed to gather the Triforce so that Hilda can steal it and use its magic to restore Lorule. Hilda orders Yuga to take Link's Triforce of Courage, but Yuga betrays Hilda and turns her into a painting alongside Zelda. After Yuga's death, Zelda and Hilda are returned to normal, but Hilda refuses to accept defeat until Link's own Lorule counterpart Ravio convinces her that she has no right to rob Hyrule of its Triforce. Taking pity on Hilda, Zelda and Link use their Triforce to restore Lorule's own, allowing Hilda's kingdom to flourish once again.

In the backstory of Breath of the Wild (2017), Zelda is at the forefront of the storyline, which is revealed through a series of cutscenes showing Link's memories. The cutscenes depict her struggles to awaken her sacred power and show her insecurities and initial resentment towards Link after he is appointed as her personal knight. Calamity Ganon appears and takes control of the Guardians and Divine Beasts, ancient Sheikah machinery used to defeat him ten millennia previously. Zelda finally awakens her sacred power while protecting Link from a fatal blow and sends him to be placed in stasis in the Shrine of Resurrection. She uses her power to seal Calamity Ganon and herself in Hyrule Castle. After 100 years she awakens Link so that he can finally destroy Ganon. In the final battle, she gives Link the Bow of Light to defeat Ganon in his dark beast form.

In 2023, Zelda and Link are due to reappear in The Legend of Zelda: Tears of the Kingdom. The upcoming release is set within the same game world and features the characters with similar appearances to their 2017 versions. Nintendo released a trailer for the game in its E3 2021 Nintendo Direct, which showed various scenes from the game, including a clip of Zelda falling into an abyss.

Spin-off games
Zelda appears in three CD-i games based on The Legend of Zelda series. In Link: The Faces of Evil (1993), she is kidnapped by Ganon and has to be rescued by Link. In Zelda: The Wand of Gamelon (1993) and Zelda's Adventure (1994), Princess Zelda is the protagonist and must save Link. Zelda: The Wand of Gamelon is noteworthy as the first time that Zelda appeared as a playable character. However, the series is generally criticized by fans and not recognized by Nintendo as canon.

Zelda is a playable character in Hyrule Warriors (2014). Her weapons include the light arrows, which have been associated with her in several previous Zelda games, a rapier, as well as the Wind Waker, the titular conductor's baton from the series' entry. The Dominion Rod from Twilight Princess is also available as downloadable content for the Wii U game and in Hyrule Warriors Legends (2016) for the Nintendo 3DS. In addition to her Hyrule Warriors incarnation, Tetra and Toon Zelda (her incarnation from Spirit Tracks) appear in Hyrule Warriors Legends (and can be added to Hyrule Warriors as downloadable content). Tetra fights primarily wielding a Cutlass and water magic-infused pistol, though like Princess Zelda can use Light Arrows during certain attacks. Toon Zelda uses her ghostly form to possess a Phantom and fights wielding its sword and shield known as Phantom Arms. In addition to her Phantom, Toon Zelda can also leave it briefly during certain attacks to unleash the power of her spirit. Tetra can be unlocked through the latter part of the main story of Hyrule Warriors Legends, while Toon Zelda appears as part of the "Phantom Hourglass & Spirit Tracks" downloadable content.

Zelda is a playable character in the rhythm game Cadence of Hyrule, which was released in 2019 for the Nintendo Switch. It is a crossover between Crypt of the NecroDancer and The Legend of Zelda series.

In Hyrule Warriors: Age of Calamity (2020), a prequel to Breath of the Wild, Princess Zelda is one of eighteen playable characters. The game tells the story of the Great Calamity that happened 100 years before Breath of the Wild.

Other game series

Zelda was introduced in the Super Smash Bros. series as a playable character in Super Smash Bros. Melee (2001) and has appeared in every subsequent game, including Super Smash Bros. Brawl (2008), Super Smash Bros. for Nintendo 3DS and Wii U (2014) and Super Smash Bros. Ultimate (2018). In Melee and Brawl, Zelda possesses the ability to transform into Sheik. In 3DS and Wii U and Ultimate, they are separate characters. Her character moves mainly involve magical attacks, while Sheik is focused more on speed and physical attacks. In Super Smash Bros. Brawl her design was based on her appearance in Twilight Princess. In a 2007 interview, Eiji Aonuma said that his design team had submitted initial character models for Sheik, Link and Ganondorf for use within the Brawl environment and Sheik was confirmed as a returning character. An alternate color variation for Zelda with an appearance similar to that of Super Smash Bros. Melee was also included in Brawl. The Twilight Princess incarnation of Zelda and Sheik returned in Super Smash Bros. for Nintendo 3DS and Wii U, this time as separate characters with no ability to switch between them in mid-battle. In Super Smash Bros. Ultimate, Sheik's design took inspiration from the Sheikah Set in Breath of the Wild and Zelda's design is based on her appearance in A Link Between Worlds and A Link To The Past.

Television series 
A set of The Legend of Zelda cartoons aired from 1989 to 1990 as a part of DiC's The Super Mario Bros. Super Show. The series was loosely based on the original game and centres on four main characters, Link, Zelda, Ganon and a fairy named Spryte. It also features Zelda's father, King Harkinian. The series developed Zelda's character and presents her with a strong personality. Although she is sometimes captured by Ganon, she is depicted as a smart, resourceful character. The series also emphasises a romantic relationship between Link and Zelda, in which Link is always begging Zelda for a kiss. Thirteen episodes were produced before the cancellation of The Super Mario Bros. Super Show. Zelda was voiced by Cyndy Preston in the TV series.

A version of cartoon Zelda (with slightly more revealing clothing) appeared in assorted episodes in the second season of Captain N: The Game Master. In this crossover, Zelda and Link befriend Kevin Keene and Princess Lana as they all attempt to restore peace to Hyrule. These appearances function as a follow-up to the original Zelda cartoon.

Comics and manga 
A comic series published in the early 1990s by Valiant Comics was based on the adventures of Zelda and Link. It ran for five issues, with a sixth story published under the Nintendo Comics System brand. The storyline echoes The Legend of Zelda animated television series, which was being aired around the same time. Like the animated series, it involves Link attempting to get a kiss from Zelda, but also depicts Zelda displaying affections towards Link. In the storyline for "To the First Power", Zelda trains to defend herself and eventually defeats a wizzrobe in order to save Link.

A serial comic by manga author Shotaro Ishinomori was originally published in 1992 in Nintendo Power magazine and later collected in graphic novel form. It was based on The Legend of Zelda: A Link to the Past and tells an alternate version of the events. It was reprinted as a single volume in 2015 by Viz Media. Other manga adaptations of The Legend of Zelda games have also been published, including Majora's Mask, Ocarina of Time, The Minish Cap and Phantom Hourglass, which are illustrated by Akira Himekawa.

Gamebooks 
Alongside Link, Zelda appears in several Nintendo gamebooks. Two books titled The Crystal Trap and The Shadow Prince were published in 1992, which were written in the style of Choose Your Own Adventure books. In The Crystal Trap, the plot focuses on Zelda freeing Link from the trap, while The Shadow Prince involves Link saving Zelda.

Reception

Critical reception 
Princess Zelda has been generally well received by critics and gamers alike. Chip ranked Princess Zelda as the third top "girl of gaming" in general. Complex placed Zelda and Sheik in the fourth and third places on its 2012 list of video game characters that deserve a spin-off. Entertainment Weeklys Darren Franich listed her as one of 15 "kick-ass women" in video games in 2013, praising how her portrayal developed from the mere princess who "got kidnapped, over and over again" in early games to "a wise-beyond-her-years youth into a major player in the battle for Hyrule" in Ocarina of Time. Den of Geek ranked Zelda in fourth place on a list of "10 Best Female Game Characters" in 2013. Zelda's alter-ego Tetra was recognised by The Guardian as one of 30 "interesting female game characters", with the comment that "despite her young age, Tetra demands respect and gets it".

Critics and gamers have also commented on Zelda's physical attractiveness. GameDaily listed her as one of the 50 "hottest video game women" in 2009, stating that while she did not start out as much, she became beautiful in later games. In 2010, Wesley Yin-Poole of VideoGamer.com included her on his list of "top ten video game crushes": "We love Peach and Kitana, but if we were stranded on a desert island and could only keep one video game princess for company, it would be Princess Zelda from the Legend of Zelda series - we've had the hots for Zelda's pointy ears for years, ever since her 8-bit days, in fact". That same year, GameTrailers included her on their countdown of the "Top 10 babes who are out of your league" at number four. Game Informer listed Sheik second on its 2011 list of the top ten disguises. In 2014, Julia Cook of Paste ranked Princess Zelda from Four Swords as the third "best dressed lady" in video games. TF1 ranked her in 13th place on its 2010 list of the sexiest video game characters to cosplay.

The relationship between Link and Princess Zelda has also been positively received. It was ranked as the number one video game romance by James Hawkins of Joystick Division, who commented, "Never overtly called-out and not yet actualized, this tacit romance has shaped one of gaming's greatest franchises". IGN chose Link and Zelda as one of "The Greatest Video Game Couples", particularly highlighting their story in Skyward Sword.

Critical commentary 
Some critical commentary has focused on Zelda's role within the series. The book Female Action Heroes described Zelda as "perhaps one of the most well-known princesses in video game history", though acknowledged that her role in the games was to serve as a "damsel in distress".

SVG.com's Cody Gravelle commented that "Princess Zelda is so famous she has an entire video game series named after her despite not having starred as the protagonist in any of its entries" and also said that despite being his best ally, she is "often overshadowed by Legend of Zelda protagonist and sometimes-partner Link".

Brendan Main for The Escapist magazine noted that Zelda's alter-ego of Sheik in Ocarina of Time broke the conventions of the character's role. He opined that "Sheik is everything Zelda is not – in fact, she's everything that Zelda cannot be. As far as princesses go, Zelda gets off better than most. She brings a certain stately grace to the role, and is a figure of wisdom and insight. Operating in a trinity that includes the villain, Ganon, symbolic of power, and the hero, Link, symbolic of courage, Zelda serves as seer and spiritual conduit. But though she is elegant and refined, it is exactly these traits that keep her off of the field of play. As an oracle, she may offer advice and comfort, but she’s still a captive to forces beyond her control".

Ashley Taylor Clark for Looper responded positively to Zelda's appearance in Breath of the Wild, describing her as "an intelligent, passionate young woman" and commenting that "her burgeoning friendship with Link shows a vulnerability that fans don't often see in a line of level-headed princesses. Instead, this Zelda struggles to fulfill her destiny and worries that her failure will mean destruction for the people she cherishes. Fully-voiced cutscenes also bring her character to life in a more relatable and human way than ever before".

Jason Guisao writing for Game Informer noted that even though the entire series is named after the character, she had been sidelined in Breath of the Wild, and stated that "Zelda's time to shine is long overdue". He opined that "Zelda should be leading the charge towards a new era where long-awaited features like fully integrated co-op – e.g., the two protagonists embarking on a harrowing, 100-hour quest together – could exist". Jacob Kastrenakes for The Verge opined that switching Link's and Zelda's roles could be possible without requiring Link to be absent. However, in an interview with GameSpot, producer Eiji Aonuma confirmed that this idea had been considered but rejected for Breath of the Wild because, "if we have Princess Zelda as the main character who fights, then what is Link going to do?" Miyamoto also commented on this at E3 2016: "Some people might wonder, you know, because the title is Zelda – it's a female character – why isn't the protagonist a female character? But really, to me, The Legend of Zelda, the main series, Link is the protagonist".

Sara Gitkos of iMore opined, "we think it's about time that Zelda had a chance to show why she deserves a game of her own" and commented, "Zelda is a scholar, a leader, and a fierce princess who takes charge of her own destiny. She is clearly a character that has a lot to offer, and it might bring a fresh look to the series to give her a shot as the main protagonist. She has proven that she can handle the likes of Ganon, and if Link can have a solo adventure without her, why can't she?"

Legacy 
Due to her popularity with gamers, Zelda's image has been recreated in various works of fan art. She has also been recreated in the form of cosplay. As the titular character, her image is widely used across various merchandise, including promotional artwork, figurines and Amiibo. Actor and comedian Robin Williams named his daughter Zelda Williams after Princess Zelda, due to being a fan of The Legend of Zelda series.

Critics and gamers consider Zelda to be a significant video game character in popular culture. In 2009, she was voted the third greatest female character in games on Nintendo systems by the Official Nintendo Magazine, which appreciated her as "a strong woman who, with her sword and bow and arrow, is capable of holding her own in a fight". Complex ranked her as the fifth greatest heroine in video game history in 2013 and ranked her at number five on its 2013 list of "old school" video game characters "who were style icons". In 2016, Digital Spy ranked the character in sixth place on a list of the "Most iconic female game characters of all time". In 2018, readers of Guinness World Records Gamer's Edition voted Princess Zelda as the 31st-top video game character of all time.

See also 
 Characters of The Legend of Zelda

Notes

References

External links

Princess Zelda page at Play Nintendo

Child characters in video games
Deity characters in video games
Female characters in video games
Fictional adolescents
Fictional archers
Fictional characters with alter egos
Fictional characters with precognition
Fictional cross-dressers
Fictional female ninja
Fictional female pirates
Fictional goddesses
Fictional humanoids
Fictional princesses
Fictional swordfighters in video games
The Legend of Zelda characters
Ninja characters in video games
Nintendo protagonists
Princess characters in video games
Queen characters in video games
Super Smash Bros. fighters
Teenage characters in video games
Telepath characters in video games
Video game characters introduced in 1986
Video game characters who can teleport
Video game characters who use magic
Woman soldier and warrior characters in video games